Aidan Patrick McLindon (born 26 February 1980) is an Australian politician. He was first elected for the seat of Beaudesert to the Queensland State Parliament for the Liberal National Party at the 2009 state election. He resigned from that party to become an independent in May 2010, and in June 2010 he established The Queensland Party, which he merged with Katter's Australian Party in August 2011. He lost his seat to the LNP at the 2012 election. Bob Katter appointed McLindon as National Director for the newly created Katter's Australian Party. 18 months later McLindon resigned to spend more time with his family. McLindon established an independent political consultancy, AMac Consultants Pty Ltd, following the 2013 federal election.

Early life and background
McLindon was born in Darwin, Northern Territory, and was a bar attendant and musician before entering politics. He attended school at Springwood State High School where he was elected a prefect.

McLindon gained some publicity in the media for his musical interests, especially his involvement in the alternative rock band KiLLTV. 

His military service included roles as an infantry soldier and driver 1997–2002 in the Australian Army.

McLindon cites an early interest in politics at the age of 15 from work experience at Queensland Parliament House in 1995. He later went on to complete a degree in Government and Politics, majoring in Public Policy, at Griffith University. McLindon acknowledged a number of academics and political scientists from the university in his inaugural speech to Queensland Parliament.

Political career
In 1998 McLindon was preselected by the Liberal Party to run for the state seat of Waterford as Australia's youngest politically endorsed candidate at the age of 17 years and completed a personal door to door campaign to 17,500 homes.

McLindon served as a Logan City councillor 2004–2009, including as Chair of the Environment and Sustainability portfolio. In 2009 he was preselected to succeed Kev Lingard as the Liberal National Party candidate for Beaudesert.

The Beaudesert campaign of 2009 saw several high-profile identities and McLindon successfully defended the seat for the LNP against former One Nation leader Pauline Hanson who contested the seat as an independent.

In early 2010, McLindon attracted significant media attention by challenging Deputy Leader of the Liberal National Party of Queensland (LNP), Lawrence Springborg, for his position in the party at a parliamentary meeting of the LNP.

In May 2010, McLindon and Burnett MP Rob Messenger, who had seconded McLindon's nomination as deputy leader, resigned from the LNP to sit as Independents, claiming that the party had become victim to "flawed political process".

In June 2010, McLindon announced the formation of a new party, The Queensland Party, based on "moderate" ideals. McLindon stated that the party would run in all Queensland seats at the next state election, with the exception of the five seats held by Independent MPs.

McLindon has advocated the removal of poker machines from towns and cities around Queensland to be moved into a new "AusVegas" in the Cairns region. He has also been a vocal advocate for the restoration of the Upper House in Queensland.

In August 2011, McLindon announced the merger of The Queensland Party with Katter's Australian Party. Some members of The Queensland Party opposed the merger but an Electoral Commission of Queensland investigation found that they did not have the required numbers to maintain the separate registration of the party and it was removed from the register of political parties in December 2011. Most Queensland Party candidates were endorsed by Katter's Australian Party. As part of the deal, McLindon became the merged party's Queensland state leader.

McLindon had no political party affiliations from 2013 until 4 July 2022 when he announced his candidacy on behalf of the right-wing Freedom Party for the seat of Mulgrave in Victoria to contest against Daniel Andrews in the state elections in November, receiving 2.2% of the vote.

References

|-

1980 births
Living people
Members of the Queensland Legislative Assembly
Liberal National Party of Queensland politicians
Independent members of the Parliament of Queensland
Katter's Australian Party politicians
Griffith University alumni
People from Darwin, Northern Territory
21st-century Australian politicians
20th-century Australian people